Can't Get You Out of My Head: An Emotional History of the Modern World is a six-part BBC documentary television series created by Adam Curtis. It was released on BBC iPlayer on 11 February 2021.

Premise
Like many of Curtis' previous works, the documentary explores and links together various topics such as individualism, collectivism, conspiracy theories, national myths, American imperialism, the history of China, artificial intelligence and the failure of technology to liberate society in the way that technological utopians once hoped it might.

Background
Originally titled What Is It That Is Coming?, the series was inspired by the rise of populism in 2016. Curtis wanted to investigate why the critics of Donald Trump and Brexit were unable to offer an alternative vision for the future, and why these sociopolitical circumstances were being continued beyond ethical breaking points.

Episodes

Critical reception
The Guardians Lucy Mangan gave the series five out of five stars and called it "dazzling" and "a dense, ambitious triumph". Sarah Carson of the i also rated Can't Get You Out of My Head five out of five stars, describing it as "terrifying" and a "masterpiece". The Independents Ed Cumming, who gave the series five out of five stars, called it a "fascinating and disorienting" series that "aims to show how radical movements, emerging after the Second World War, were neutralised and co-opted by an establishment determined to maintain the status quo".

James Walton of The Spectator thought the series was just a variation on Curtis's theme of "how hopeless — in both senses — human beings are", deriding it as "incoherent and conspiracy-fuelled", though only having been able to preview four episodes of the six-part series. Ed Power in The Telegraph found the series "completely implausible", awarding it only three out of five stars.

In a sceptical review for Sight & Sound, Hannah McGill wrote: "Curtis practices journalism absent the qualities that give it credibility: specificity, corroboration, consistency. Instead, he serves up a soup of interesting, oddball historical anecdotes, accompanied by a voiceover favouring giant, blurry assertions about how 'we' interact with 'those in power' during the 'strange days' in which we live. Who are “we”? English speakers? Men? BBC viewers? People who watch Adam Curtis documentaries?"

References

Further reading

External links
 
 
 

2021 British television series debuts
2021 British television series endings
2020s British documentary television series
BBC television documentaries
English-language television shows
Films about philosophy